The Last Parable is a 1953 novel by Alec Coppel about the life and times of a judge. It differed from much of Coppel's usual output in that it was not a murder mystery or comedy.

The book was banned in Ireland.

References

External links
The Last Parable at AustLit

English novels
1953 British novels
1953 Australian novels
Novels by Alec Coppel